Linda Nellie Moss is a South African politician who served as a Member of Parliament (MP) for the African National Congress.

Moss resigned from the National Assembly with effect from 2 March 2023. Ebrahim Patel succeeded her.

References

See also 

 List of National Assembly members of the 27th Parliament of South Africa

Living people
Members of the National Assembly of South Africa
Women members of the National Assembly of South Africa
African National Congress politicians
21st-century South African women politicians
21st-century South African politicians
Year of birth missing (living people)